Family of patatin-like phospholipases  consists of various patatin glycoproteins from the total soluble protein from potato tubers, and also some proteins found in vertebrates. Patatin is a storage protein but it also has the enzymatic activity of phospholipase, catalysing the cleavage of fatty acids from membrane lipids.

Subfamilies
Protein of unknown function UPF0028

Human proteins containing this domain 
PNPLA1;    PNPLA2;    PNPLA3;    PNPLA4;    PNPLA5;    PNPLA6;    PNPLA7;    PNPLA8;

References

Protein domains
Protein families
Single-pass transmembrane proteins
Hydrolases